Cahuita National Park is a terrestrial and marine national park in the Caribbean La Amistad Conservation Area of Costa Rica located on the southern Caribbean coast in Limón Province, connected to the town of Cahuita. It protects beaches and lowlands and attracts tourists and other visitors who are able to snorkel in the protected marine area which contains the coralline reefs, as well as being a nesting ground for sea turtles. February through April typically have the best underwater visibility. This is also one of the nicest and least developed beaches in Costa Rica.

The 600-acre (242-ha) reef is known to have at least 35 species of coral, 140 species of molluscs, 44 species of crustaceans, and 123 species of fish. The outer reef is about 4 km long.  On land there are many types of animal as well including northern tamanduas, pacas, white-nosed coatis, raccoons, sloths, agoutis, mantled howlers and white-headed capuchins.
It has a variety of birds as well including the green ibis, green-and-rufous kingfisher and keel-billed toucan. Marine mammals are also present including orcas.

Due to its proximity to the town of Cahuita, the park's roads and facilities are well developed. Roads access the park from both the north and south. It can be reached on foot via Kelly Creek, which is just south of Cahuita.

History
Originally the site was created as the Cahuita National Monument in 1970, and was reformed as a National Park in 1978.  This change was ratified in 1982.  Cahuita National Park also has the distinction of the only national park in Costa Rica not to charge an admission fee (at the Cahuita entrance) and instead relies on donations.

References

External links
 Local District Website information on the park
 Cahuita National Park Guide 

National parks of Costa Rica
Protected areas established in 1982
Geography of Limón Province
Tourist attractions in Limón Province
1982 establishments in Costa Rica